Saint Joseph the Hesychast (born Francis Kottis, ; Lefkes, Paros, February 12, 1897 – Mount Athos, August 15, 1959) was a Greek Orthodox monk and elder who led a small group of monks at Mount Athos. He was canonized as a saint by the Ecumenical Patriarchate of Constantinople in 2020. His annual feast is celebrated on August 16.

Early life
He was born Frangiskos (Francis) Kottis on 12 February 1897 in Lefkes, a village on the Greek Aegean island of Paros. His parents were Georgios and Maria Kottis. He was the third of seven children in his family. When he was a child, Francis' father died, leaving his mother Maria had to care for the family. Until his teenage years, he remained in the village, helping his mother and his family with various tasks for a living. He attended school until second grade. He also served in the Greek Navy. At approximately the age of 23, he worked as a vendor in Piraeus and Athens. While in Athens, he began to read about the lives of saints and ascetics. On Mount Penteli, he would stay up all night praying in caves or even on trees, similar to the medieval anchorites and stylites. Afterwards, he went to Mount Athos to become a monk.

Monastic life

In 1921, his first destination was Katounakia in the Mount Athos region. He left with the blessing of Elder Daniel as he moved on to pursue a more ascetic lifestyle.

A year later, he came to Mount Athos on the day of the Transfiguration of the Savior, celebrated at the summit of Mount Athos in the Chapel of the Transfiguration. There, he met Father Arsenios (also known as Elder Arsenios the Cave Dweller; b. 1886, d. 1983), a monk at Stavronikita Monastery who would later become his disciple. Looking for a disciplined elder who would help him with asceticism, in 1924 he went with Fr. Arsenios to the Holy Cell of the Annunciation of the Virgin Mary in Katounakia, to become followers of the two elders Ephraim and Joseph. On 31 August 1925, at the age of 28, he was given the name Joseph of Vigla in the cave of St. Athanasius the Athonite. In mid-1928, Monk Joseph and Fr. Arsenios decided to move to a more mountainous and remote area around the Skete of St. Basil After about ten years of intensive spiritual practice, fasting, and prayer with Fr. Arsenios, as well as many experiences of divine grace, Monk Joseph agreed to accompany and become the spiritual guide of any monk who would follow him. During the period of his stay in the Skete of St. Basil, Elder Joseph Kottis was also the spiritual guide of Father Ephraim Katounakiotis. During the same period, Elder Joseph's brother, Nicholas Kottis, left the secular world to join his brother's group as a monk, and took the name Athanasios.

In January 1938, the small group led by Elder Joseph went to Little St. Anne's Skete, where they settled in caves near a chapel of Timios Prodromos, which they had built themselves. His first disciple during the group's stay at Little St. Anne's Skete was the Cypriot monk Sophronios, who took the name Joseph and later served as Elder of the Holy Monastery of Vatopedi on Mount Athos until his death on July 1, 2009. Another member of the group was Father Ephraim, later Elder Ephraim and Abbot of the Holy Monastery of Philotheou on Mount Athos, and also the founder of over 19 monasteries in the United States and Canada. Another one of Joseph's disciples was Haralambos (later Haralambos of Dionysiou), who would later become the abbot of Dionysiou Monastery. In 1953, Elder Joseph's group settled in the New Skete of Athos, which was the final skete that he stayed at during his lifetime.

Death and burial
A month before his burial, he claimed to have been informed of the exact time by the Virgin Mary herself.

On 14 August 1959, he attended the holy vigil in honor of the Dormition of the Virgin Mary and took the Blessed Sacrament. He died from heart failure on August 15. He was laid to rest on 15 August 1959 in a tomb in the holy chapel of the Annunciation of the Virgin Mary in the New Skete of Mount Athos, near the Tower of the Skete. His sacred relics are kept in monasteries, including St. Anthony's Greek Orthodox Monastery in Florence, Arizona, United States.

Today, his tomb, enshrined in a chapel, can be visited at the northern edge of New Skete on Mount Athos. The hermitage of Saint Joseph the Hesychast, a hut on a cliff overlooking the sea, is located in a steep area with dense vegetation that is just north of Little Saint Anne's Skete.

Canonization

On 20 October 2019, Ecumenical Patriarch Bartholomew I of Constantinople announced the beatification of Elder Joseph the Hesychast at Karyes, Mount Athos. His remains are kept in Vatopedi Monastery. On 9 March 2020, the Holy and Sacred Synod of the Ecumenical Patriarchate, by the Patriarchal and Synodal Act, inscribed Elder Joseph in the Holy Calendar of the Orthodox Church.

Legacy
His teachings and spiritual work are preserved in 65 letters published by the Holy Monastery of Philotheou, as well as in various books. He is also known for his mystical approach to advocating for the use of the Jesus Prayer at Mount Athos. Elder Joseph the Hesychast played a key role in the repopulation of six monasteries at Mount Athos, as well as many nunneries in Greece.

His life and spiritual legacy are presented in a documentary film titled Elder Joseph the Hesychast (2019), which was produced, written and edited by the Holy Monastery of Vatopedi. The documentary won four awards from the jury at the London Greek Film Festival in London.

See also

Arsenios the Cave Dweller
Daniel Katounakiotis
Joseph of Vatopedi
Paisios of Mount Athos
Silouan the Athonite

References

Sources
Mesa Potamos Kyprou, Holy Monastery of Timios Prodromos (2018). Saint Elder Joseph the Hesychast. Athens: Athos Ltd. (Stamouli SA). .
Lekkos, Evangelos P. (2011). Elder Joseph the Hesychast. Athens: Saitis. .
Elder Ephraim Philotheitis (2008). My Elder Joseph the Hesychast and Cave Dweller (1897-1959). Arizona, U.S. .

Triantaphyllos, Prot. Georgios (2007). Elder Joseph the Hesychast, the Neptic Father and Teacher. Paros: Panagia Myrtidiotissa Holy Hermitage. .
Elder Joseph of Vatopaidi (1999). Elder Joseph the Hesychast: Struggles, Experiences, Teachings (1898-1959). Mount Athos: The Great and Holy Monastery of Vatopaidi. 236 p. . (English translation of the original Greek by Elizabeth Theokritoff)

Further reading

External links
Elder Joseph the Hesychast (film)
Joseph the Hesychast on OrthodoxWiki

 
1897 births
1959 deaths
20th-century Christian saints
20th-century Christian mystics
Christian ascetics
Athonite Fathers
Eastern Orthodox mystics
Eastern Orthodox monks
Greek saints of the Eastern Orthodox Church
Hesychasts
Saints of modern Greece
People from Paros
Panentheists
People associated with Stavronikita Monastery
People associated with Great Lavra